Vicente Flores (born 7 February 1955) is a Venezuelan footballer. He played in one match for the Venezuela national football team in 1975. He was also part of Venezuela's squad for the 1975 Copa América tournament.

References

External links
 

1955 births
Living people
Venezuelan footballers
Venezuela international footballers
Place of birth missing (living people)
Association football forwards
Portuguesa F.C. players
Estudiantes de Mérida players